Uzi Vogelman (born October 6, 1954) is a current justice in the Supreme Court of Israel.

Vogelman was born in Tel Aviv. After serving in the Israel Defense Forces, he studied law at Tel Aviv University. He earned an LLB and was admitted to the Israel Bar Association in 1980. He then earned an LLM from the Hebrew University of Jerusalem in 1985 and a Master of Public Administration from the John F. Kennedy School of Government at Harvard University in 1990. Vogelman served as an attorney in the State Attorney's office from 1982 to 1995, first in the Criminal Division and High Court of Justice Division, then as Deputy and Senior Deputy to the State Attorney. He served as the Director of the Department of Constitutional and Administrative Law from 1995 to 2000.

In 2000, he was appointed a judge on the Tel Aviv District Court, and in 2007, he served as an acting justice on the Supreme Court of Israel. He became a permanent judge on the Supreme Court in 2009, and is expected to become its Chief Justice in 2023 following Esther Hayut's retirement.

Notable Rulings
 In 2009, the court granted a petition regarding an IDF order barring Palestinians from driving on Road 443 .

References

Living people
1954 births
Tel Aviv University alumni
Judges of the Supreme Court of Israel
People from Tel Aviv
Israeli Jews
Harvard Kennedy School alumni